Caterina Carpano (born 19 March 1998) is an Italian snowboarder. She competed at the 2022 Winter Olympics, in  Women's snowboard cross.

She competed at the 2018–19 FIS Freestyle Ski World Cup, 2020–21 FIS Freestyle Ski World Cup, and 2021–22 FIS Freestyle Ski World Cup.

References 

Living people
1998 births
Italian female snowboarders
Olympic snowboarders of Italy
Snowboarders at the 2022 Winter Olympics
Sportspeople from Trentino
Snowboarders at the 2016 Winter Youth Olympics
21st-century Italian women